César Andrés Rojas Villegas (born 23 March 1988) is a Costa Rican cyclist, who is currently suspended from the sport following a positive drugs test at the 2017 Vuelta Ciclista a Costa Rica. His brother Juan Carlos Rojas is also a cyclist.

Major results

2008
 1st  Road race, National Under-23 Road Championships
2010
 National Road Championships
1st  Time trial
2nd Under-23 road race
2012
 Vuelta Ciclista a Costa Rica
1st Stages 4 & 6
2013
 10th Overall Vuelta Ciclista a Costa Rica
2014
 2nd Overall Vuelta Ciclista a Costa Rica
1st  Mountains classification
1st Stage 3
 3rd Time trial, National Road Championships
2015
 4th Overall Vuelta Ciclista a Costa Rica
1st  Mountains classification
1st Stages 9 & 10
2016
 1st  Overall Vuelta Ciclista a Costa Rica
1st Stage 3
 National Road Championships
2nd Time trial
3rd Road race
2017
3rd Overall Vuelta Ciclista a Costa Rica
1st Stage 9

References

External links

1988 births
Living people
Costa Rican male cyclists